Film Without a Title (German: Film ohne Titel) is a 1948 German comedy film directed by Rudolf Jugert and starring Hans Söhnker, Hildegard Knef and Irene von Meyendorff. It was made by Bavaria Film at the Emelka Studios in Munich in the American Zone of Occupation. Location shooting took place around Lüchow-Dannenberg in Lower Saxony. The film's sets were designed by the art directors Robert Herlth and Max Seefelder.

Cast
 Hans Söhnker as Martin Delius  
 Hildegard Knef as Christine Fleming  
 Irene von Meyendorff as Angelika Rösch  
 Erich Ponto as Herr Schichtholz  
 Carl Voscherau as Bauer Fleming  
 Carsta Löck as Frau Schichtholz  
 Fritz Wagner as Jochen Fleming  
 Käte Pontow as Helene  
 Willy Fritsch as himself (Actor)  
 Fritz Odemar as Screenwriter  
 Peter Hamel as himself (Director) 
 Annemarie Holtz as Viktoria Luise Winkler  
 Hildegard Grethe as Bäuerin Fleming  
 Margarete Haagen as Haushälterin Emma  
 Werner Finck as Hubert  
 Nicolas Koline as Kaminsky  
 Hannes Brackebusch as Geheimrat Pöschmann  
 Bum Krüger as Dancke 
 Auguste Hansen-Kleinmichel as Frau Quandt  
 Lilo Hauer as Erica Quandt  
 Rudolf Helten as Jünemann  
 Elly Klippe as Frau Wenndorf  
 Bertha Picard as Frau Pöschmann  
 Walter Pose as Heimkehrer  
 Arnold Risch as Gendarm

References

Bibliography
 Shandley, Robert R. Rubble Films: German Cinema in the Shadow of the Third Reich. Temple University Press, 2001.

External links 
 

1948 films
1948 comedy films
West German films
German comedy films
1940s German-language films
Films directed by Rudolf Jugert
Self-reflexive films
Films about filmmaking
Bavaria Film films
Films shot at Bavaria Studios
German black-and-white films
1940s German films